Johann Friedrich von Brandt (25 May 1802 – 15 July 1879) was a German-Russian naturalist, who worked mostly in Russia.

Brandt was born in Jüterbog and educated at a gymnasium in Wittenberg and the University of Berlin.

In 1831 he emigrated to Russia, and soon was appointed director of the Zoological Museum of the St Petersburg Academy of Sciences. Brandt encouraged the collection of native animals, many of which were not represented in the museum. Many specimens began to arrive from the expeditions of Severtzov, Przhevalsky, Middendorff, Schrenck and Gustav Radde.

He described several birds collected by Russian explorers off the Pacific Coast of North America, including Brandt's cormorant, red-legged kittiwake and spectacled eider.

As a paleontologist, Brandt ranks among the best. He was also an entomologist, specialising in Coleoptera (beetles) and Diplopoda (millipedes).

He died in Merreküll, Governorate of Estonia.

He is also commemorated in Brandt's bat, Brandt's hedgehog, three other species of mammals, and the lizard Iranolacerta brandtii.

Works
In addition, Johann Friedrich von Brandt  concerned the continuation of the work Getreue Darstellung und Beschreibung der in der Arzneykunde gebräuchlichen Gewächse of Friedrich Gottlob Hayne.
Flora Berolinensis, sive descriptio plantarum phanerogamarum circa Berolinum sponte crescentium vel in agris cultarum additis filicibus et charis (Berlin, 1824)
Deutschlands phanerogamische Giftgewächse (Berlin, 1828)
Tabellar Uebersichi d. offizin. Gewächse nach d. Linn. Sexualsystem u. d. natürl. System (Berlin, 1829)
Medizinische Zoologie oder getreue Darstellung und Beschreibung der Thiere, die in der Arzneimittellehre in Betracht kommen, 2 vols. (Berlin, 1829–1833), written with J. T. C. Ratzeburt
Uebersicht d. Charactere d. Familien d. offizin. Gewächse nach R. Brown, De Candolle, Jussieu,… (Berlin, 1830)
Deutschlands kryptogamische Giftgewächse (Berlin, 1838)
Deutschlands phanerogamische Geftgewächse as Abbildung und Beschreibung der in Deutschland wild wachsenden und in Gärten in freien ausdauernden Giftgewächse, nach natürlichen Familien erläutert, mit Beiträgen von P. Phoebus und J. T. C. Ratzeburg (Berlin, 1838)
Symbolae Sirenologicae quibus praecipue Rhutinae historia naturalis illustratur (St. Petersburg, 1846)
Symbolae Sirenologicae…, fasc. 2 and 3 (St. Petersburg, 1861–1868)
Mémoires de l’Académie impériale des sciences, St. Pétersbourg, 7th ser., 12, no. 1; Untersuchungen über die fossilen und subfossilen Cetaceen Europa’s mit Beiträgen von Van Beneden, Cornalia, Gastaldi, Quenstedt, und Paulson, nebst einem geologischen Anhange von Barbot de Marny, G. von Helmersen, A. Goebel und Th. Fuchs, ibid., 20, no. 1 (1873)
Ergänzungen, ibid., 21, no. 6 (1874)
Bericht über die Fortschritte, welche die zoologischen Wissenschaften den von der kaiserlichen Akademie der Wissenschaften zu St. Petersburg von 1831 bis 1879 herausgegeben Schriften verdanken (St. Petersburg, 1879)
J. F. Brandtii index operum omnium (St. Petersburg, 1876), issued as a Festschrift.
Getreue Darstellung und Beschreibung der in der Arzneykunde gebräuchlichen Gewächse wie auch solcher, welche mit ihnen verwechselt werden können. 12 Volumes, 1805–1856 (continued from Johann Friedrich Brandt, Julius Theodor Christian Ratzeburg und Johann Friedrich Klotzsch). Digital Edition by the University and State Library Düsseldorf
 Abbildung und Beschreibung der in Deutschland wild wachsenden und in Gärten im Freien ausdauernden Giftgewächse nach natürlichen Familien erläutert. Band 1: Phanerogamen Hirschwald, Berlin 1834 Digital edition by the University and State Library Düsseldorf
 Abbildung und Beschreibung der in Deutschland wild wachsenden und in Gärten im Freien ausdauernden Giftgewächse nach natürlichen Familien erläutert. Band 2: Kryptogamen Hirschwald, Berlin 1838 Digital edition by the University and State Library Düsseldorf
Untersuchungen über die fossilen und subfossilen cetaceen Europa's. Mémoires de L'Académie Impériale des Sciences de Saint-Petersbourg, Series 7 20(1):1-372 1873

Taxa described by Brandt

Genera
Hemisyntrachelus

Species
 Acipenser baerii  Brandt, 1869 (Siberian sturgeon)
 Acipenser guldenstadti Brandt & Ratzeburg, 1833 (Caspian or Russian sturgeon)
 Acipenser schrenckii  Brandt, 1869 (Amur sturgeon)
Chrysaora Fuscescens Brandt, 1835 (Pacific sea nettle)
 Emberiza bruniceps  Brandt, 1841 (Red-headed bunting)
 Emberiza cioides  Brandt, 1843 (Meadow bunting)
 Holothuria leucospilota Brandt, 1835 (black long sea cucumber)
 Idotea ochotensis  Brandt, 1851
 Lasiopodomys brandtii (Radde, 1861) (Brandt's vole)
 Ligia dilatata  Brandt, 1833 (sea slater)
Metridium farcimen Brandt, 1835 (Giant Plumose Anemone)
 Mesocricetus brandti (Nehring, 1898) (Brandt's or Turkish hamster)
 Myotis brandtii Eversmann, 1845 (Brandt's bat)
 Paraechinus hypomelas (Brandt, 1836) (Brandt's hedgehog)
 Urile penicillatus (Brandt, 1837) (Brandt's cormorant)
 Porphyrophora hamelii Brandt, 1833 (Armenian cochineal)
 Somateria fischeri Brandt, 1847 (spectacled eider)
 Stichopus chloronotus  Brandt, 1835 (black sea cucumber)
 Trionyx maackii  Brandt, 1858 (Chinese softshell turtle)

References
 Anonym 1877 Das fünfzigjährige Doktorjubiläum des Akademikers Geheimrat Johann Friedrich Brandt am 12.(24.) Januar 1876. St. Petersburg.
 Anonym 1879 [Brandt, J. F.] Botan. Ztg. 37 743
 Anonym 1879: [Brandt, J. F.] Naturaliste Canad. 1 111
 Anonym 1879: [Biography] Zool. Anz. 2 480
 Medvedev, G. S. 2000 [Brandt, J. F.] Trudy Russk. ent. Obsc. 71 6-22, Portr.
 Ratzeburg, J. T. C. 1874 Forstwissenschaftliches Schriftsteller-Lexikon. Berlin, Nicolai'sche Buchhandlung : X+1-516 72-76
 Strauch, A. 1889 Das zoologische Museum der Kaiserlichen Akademie der Wissenschaften zu St. Petersburg in seinem fünfzigjährigen Bestehen.

Notes

External links
 
 
 Brandt J. F. scanned books.
 Brandt, Johann Friedrich in Complete Dictionary of Scientific Biography.

German taxonomists
1802 births
1879 deaths
German carcinologists
German entomologists
German ornithologists
Myriapodologists
Full members of the Saint Petersburg Academy of Sciences
People from Jüterbog
People from the Province of Brandenburg
Humboldt University of Berlin alumni
19th-century German zoologists
Privy Councillor (Russian Empire)